MNK Seljak Livno is a futsal club from Livno, Bosnia and Herzegovina. It competes in Premier Futsal League of Bosnia and Herzegovina and is one of most illustrious clubs in the country.

History
Club played in Yugoslavian futsal league and reached stars in last years of Yugoslavia. First, in 1989–90 season club reached final and lost to Uspinjača Zagreb 2–0, in final played in Srijemska Mitrovica.

Biggest achievement

Next year, Seljak qualified to final once again, and once again Uspinjača was the opponent. This time Seljak won 1-0 and revenged for loss in previous year. Final was played in Zagreb, Uspinjača's home. This was last season of Yugoslavian league.

European elite

In 1991, Seljak took part in Futsal European Clubs Championship, held in Madrid. After defeating Italian side Roma RCB 7–5, Seljak lost to Portuguese champion Freixeiro 6-4 and finished second in group. In semifinal Seljak lost 10–2 to Interviu Lloyd's, now known as Inter Movistar. In third-place match Seljak defeated Hungarian champion Magyar Mugy 11–7.

Bosnia and Herzegovina

After Yugoslavia breakup, Seljak started to play in Bosnia and Herzegovina leagues. It won three titles of Federation of Bosnia and Herzegovina League, in 2003, 2006 and 2007, also winning the Cup in 2001.

Premier League

Since 2013-14 Seljak competes in nationwide Premier League. In 2015 Seljak was Bosnia and Herzegovina Cup runner-up, losing to Zrinjski 4–3 on aggregate.

Honours

Domestic competitions
First League of Federation of Bosnia and Herzegovina:
 Winners (3): 2003, 2006, 2007
Bosnia and Herzegovina Futsal Cup:
 Winners (1): 2001
 Runner-up (1): 2015

European competitions
Futsal European Clubs Championship:
 Third place (1): 1991

Facilities
Seljak plays its home games in Sportska dvorana Dalibor Perković Dali hall named after Dalibor Perković Dali, legendary goalkeeper who was part of Seljak's championship team in 1991. He was killed in war in 1993. The hall can seat 400 people.

References

Futsal clubs in Bosnia and Herzegovina
Futsal clubs established in 1979
Sport in Livno
1979 establishments in Bosnia and Herzegovina